Mary McLeod may refer to:

 Mary McLeod Bethune (1875–1955), American educator
 Mary Adelia McLeod (1938-2022), American Episcopalian clergy, first woman Diocesan Bishop in the Episcopal Church
 Mary E. McLeod (active since 1984), Canadian costume designer

See also
 Mary MacLeod (disambiguation)
 Mary Macleod (born 1969), British Conservative Party politician
 Mary Anne MacLeod Trump (1912–2000), mother of Donald Trump.